1-Hexanol (IUPAC name hexan-1-ol) is an organic alcohol with a six-carbon chain and a condensed structural formula of CH3(CH2)5OH.  This colorless liquid is slightly soluble in water, but miscible with diethyl ether and ethanol.  Two additional straight chain isomers of 1-hexanol, 2-hexanol and 3-hexanol, exist, both of which differing by the location of the hydroxyl group.  Many isomeric alcohols have the formula C6H13OH. It is used in the perfume industry.

Preparation
Hexanol is produced industrially by the oligomerization of ethylene using triethylaluminium followed by oxidation of the alkylaluminium products.  An idealized synthesis is shown:
Al(C2H5)3 + 6C2H4 → Al(C6H13)3
Al(C6H13)3 + O2 + 3H2O → 3HOC6H13 + Al(OH)3
The process generates a range of oligomers that are separated by distillation.

Alternative methods
Another method of preparation entails hydroformylation of 1-pentene followed by hydrogenation of the resulting aldehydes.  This method is practiced in industry to produce mixtures of isomeric C6-alcohols, which are precursors to plasticizers.

In principle, 1-hexene could be converted to 1-hexanol by hydroboration (diborane in tetrahydrofuran followed by treatment with hydrogen peroxide and sodium hydroxide):

This method is instructive and useful in laboratory synthesis but of no practical relevance because of the commercial availability of inexpensive 1-hexanol from ethylene.

Occurrence in nature
1-Hexanol is believed to be a component of the odour of freshly mown grass.  Alarm pheromones emitted by the Koschevnikov gland of honey bees contain 1-hexanol. It also is partly responsible for the fragrance of strawberries.

See also

 Cis-3-Hexenal, another volatile organic compound, is also considered responsible for the freshly mowed grass flavor.

References

External links

Flavors
Hexanols
Primary alcohols